Bellingham railway station is in the London Borough of Lewisham in south London. It is in Travelcard Zone 3, and the station and all trains are operated by Thameslink. The station buildings lie on Randlesdown Road in Bellingham; the platforms are below street level.

The station, which lies on what today is known as the Catford Loop, was opened on 1 July 1892.

Services 
Off-peak, all services at Bellingham are operated by Thameslink using  EMUs.

The typical off-peak service in trains per hour is:

 2 tph to London Blackfriars
 2 tph to  via 

In addition, the service to London Blackfriars is extended to and from  via .

References

External links 

Railway stations in the London Borough of Lewisham
Former London, Chatham and Dover Railway stations
Railway stations in Great Britain opened in 1892
Railway stations served by Southeastern
Railway stations served by Govia Thameslink Railway